Thriller may refer to:
 Thriller (genre), a broad genre of literature, film and television
 Thriller film, a film genre under the general thriller genre

Comics
 Thriller (DC Comics), a comic book series published 1983–84 by DC Comics in the US
 Thriller Comics, later known as Thriller Comics Library and Thriller Picture Library, a series of comics published by Amalgamated Press/Fleetway in the UK from 1951 to 1963
 Boris Karloff Thriller, a comic published by Gold Key Comics in 1962

Films
 Thriller – A Cruel Picture, a 1973 film by Bo Arne Vibenius
 The Thriller, a 2010  Indian film
 Thriller (2018 film), a slasher horror film starring Mykelti Williamson and RZA
 Thriller, a 1979 film by Sally Potter

Music
 Thriller (album), a 1982 album by Michael Jackson
 "Thriller" (song), a song by Michael Jackson
 Thriller 25, a 2008 special 25th anniversary edition of the Jackson album
 Michael Jackson's Thriller (music video), a 1983 music video
 "Thriller" (viral video), a 2007 video featuring prison inmates in Cebu, Philippines recreating the dance from Michael Jackson's music video
 Thriller – Live, a 2009 musical featuring the music of the Jackson 5 and Michael Jackson
 Thriller (Cold Blood album) (1973)
 Thriller (Eddie and the Hot Rods album) (1979)
 Thriller (Lambchop album) (1997)
 Thriller (Swoop album) (1993)
 Thriller (EP), a 2013 EP by BtoB
 Thr!!!er, a 2013 album by !!!
 Thriller, a 1982 album by Killer
 Thriller, a 2009 album by Part Chimp
 Thriller, a 2000s American rock band featuring Jeremy Bolm
 "Thriller", a song by Fall Out Boy from Infinity on High, 2007

Television
 Thriller (British TV series) (1973–1976), an anthology television series
 Thriller (American TV series) (1960–1962), an anthology television series hosted by Boris Karloff

Roller coasters 
 Thriller (roller coaster) or Tsunami
 The Thriller (roller coaster)
 Thriller (Land of Make Believe)

Other uses
 Thriller Manju (born 1972), Indian film actor, martial artist, director, screenwriter, stunt coordinator, and choreographer
 Thriller (short story collection), a 2006 short story collection edited by James Patterson
 The Thriller, a magazine published in the 1910s, which reprinted stories from The Black Cat and possibly other sources.

See also
 Thrill (disambiguation)
 Triller (disambiguation)